The Central Council of Afghan Trade Unions (CCATU) was a labour council established by the People's Democratic Party of Afghanistan in 1978 to organize the Afghan labour movement. It was purged and restructured in 1979 by the Soviet Union.

In 1990 the CCATU was replaced by the National Workers' Union of Afghanistan.

References

Trade unions established in 1978
Trade unions disestablished in 1990
Trade unions in Afghanistan
1978 establishments in Afghanistan
1990 disestablishments in Asia
Defunct trade unions of Asia
Defunct organisations based in Afghanistan